Anthony Aymard (born 11 May 1988) is a French association footballer who plays as a defender.

Career
Aymard was signed onto the 2011 S.League squad for Etoile FC, and made his debut in the starting 11 on the opening matchday against Geylang United in which Etoile FC ran out 2-0 winners. On 1 July 2012 he signed for the club of Tanjong Pagar United FC. On 18 November 2012 he scored his first goal in S-League against Home United on a direct free kick from 50 meters. On 19 January 2016, he signed a two-year contract with six times Cambodian champions, Phnom Penh Crown.

References

External links
 
 Anthony Aymard Interview
 Anthony Aymard: "I don't particularly want to return to France"

Living people
1988 births
French footballers
Expatriate footballers in Singapore
People from Le Puy-en-Velay
Tanjong Pagar United FC players
Singapore Premier League players
Phnom Penh Crown FC players
Expatriate footballers in Cambodia
Association football defenders
Sportspeople from Haute-Loire
French expatriate sportspeople in Cambodia
French expatriate sportspeople in Singapore
Étoile FC players
Footballers from Auvergne-Rhône-Alpes